Kumela Fituma (born 13 November 1958) is an Ethiopian sprinter. He competed in the men's 4 × 400 metres relay at the 1980 Summer Olympics.

References

External links
 

1958 births
Living people
Athletes (track and field) at the 1980 Summer Olympics
Ethiopian male sprinters
Olympic athletes of Ethiopia
Place of birth missing (living people)
20th-century Ethiopian people
21st-century Ethiopian people